The dotted circle, in Unicode, is a typographic character used to illustrate the effect of a combining mark, such as a diacritic mark. In Windows, it is possible to use the key combination  to produce the character.

Illustration 
A Unicode combining mark combines with a preceding character. When used as stand-alone, it would combine unintentionally with a preceding character (possibly a space):
 Diacritic  ̒ used alone between regular spaces
 Diacritic ◌̒ used after a character

Using the generic dotted circle character also shows the relative positioning of the diacritic.

External links 
 Dotted circle on fileformat.info

References 

Diacritics
Unicode formatting code points
Circles